Trochonanina is a genus of gastropods belonging to the family Urocyclidae.

The species of this genus are found in Africa and Malesia.

Species:

Trochonanina acutecarinata 
Trochonanina aethiopica 
Trochonanina albolabiata 
Trochonanina albopicta 
Trochonanina alfieriana 
Trochonanina bloyeti 
Trochonanina bollingeri 
Trochonanina bonhouri 
Trochonanina bowkerae 
Trochonanina bunguranensis 
Trochonanina calabarica 
Trochonanina connollyi 
Trochonanina consociata 
Trochonanina coryndoni 
Trochonanina dendrotrochoides 
Trochonanina densestriata 
Trochonanina dybowskii 
Trochonanina elatior 
Trochonanina elgonensis 
Trochonanina episcopalis 
Trochonanina eussoensis 
Trochonanina formosa 
Trochonanina germaini 
Trochonanina gigas 
Trochonanina gracilior 
Trochonanina gracilistriata 
Trochonanina gwendolinae 
Trochonanina heraclea 
Trochonanina inflata 
Trochonanina inflata 
Trochonanina insignis 
Trochonanina jingaensis 
Trochonanina koenigi 
Trochonanina lessensis 
Trochonanina levistriata 
Trochonanina martensiana 
Trochonanina mesogaea 
Trochonanina miocenica 
Trochonanina mioelgonensis 
Trochonanina monozonata 
Trochonanina mozambicensis 
Trochonanina multisulcata 
Trochonanina mwanihanae 
Trochonanina nyiroensis 
Trochonanina obtusangula 
Trochonanina pitmani 
Trochonanina plicatula 
Trochonanina pseudomozambicensis 
Trochonanina pyramidea 
Trochonanina rodhaini 
Trochonanina rosenbergi 
Trochonanina rothschildi 
Trochonanina shimbiensis 
Trochonanina smithi 
Trochonanina solida 
Trochonanina sororcula 
Trochonanina sturanyi 
Trochonanina talcosa 
Trochonanina thermarum 
Trochonanina tulearensis 
Trochonanina tumidula 
Trochonanina voiensis 
Trochonanina zeltneri

References

Gastropods